Michael Helding (1506 – 30 September 1561) was a Roman Catholic bishop, scholar, writer and humanist. He is also known by his pen-name of Sidonius.

Life 
Helding was born in Langenenslingen bei Riedlingen/Sigmaringen, a miller's son. In autumn 1525 he matriculated at the University of Tübingen. At Pentecost in 1527 he graduated BA and at Christmas 1528 as MA. He became a lecturer in Mainz, where he became rector of the Domschule (cathedral school) in 1531. There he began his lifelong close contact with humanism. After being ordained as a priest, he worked under cardinal Albrecht von Brandenburg at Mainz Cathedral from 1533 onwards.

On 18 October 1537 he was selected to become auxiliary bishop of Mainz and was ordained to that role on 4 August the following year. He was also appointed titular bishop of Sidon. In 1543 he graduated as doctor of theology. He served as a Roman Catholic delegate at both the 1540-1541 Diet of Worms and in 1546 at the Diet of Regensburg. He also attended the Council of Trent. At the 'armoured' Diet of Augsburg of 1547-48 he became the co-author of the Augsburg Interim, drawing harsh polemics from Matthias Flacius and other Protestants. In December 1550 he became the successor to the Protestant George III, Prince of Anhalt-Dessau as the last Catholic bishop of Merseburg. He was present at the Council of Augsburg in 1555 and in autumn 1557 at the Colloquy of Worms, where his questions caused internal conflict between Lutheran theologians. In 1561, less than a year before Helding's death, Ferdinand I appointed him head of the Imperial Council in Vienna.  He died in Vienna, aged about 55.

Helding is considered one of the most important proponents of Catholic Reform of his time, who tried to use his speeches and writings to maintain Christian unity and to contribute actively towards what he saw as a necessary reform of the Roman Catholic church. He remained true to Catholicism, but was still friendly to reform and tolerant towards the Protestant denominations and other faiths.

Bibliography

Paul Tschackert: Helding, Michael. In: Allgemeine Deutsche Biographie (ADB). Band 34, Duncker & Humblot, Leipzig 1892, S. 164–166.
Friedrich Wilhelm Bautz: HELDING, Michael. In: Biographisch-Bibliographisches Kirchenlexikon (BBKL). Band 2, Bautz, Hamm 1990, Sp. 696–698.

External links
 Digitalised works on CAMENA
 (for Chronology of Bishops) 
 (for Chronology of Bishops)  

Roman Catholic bishops of Merseburg
1506 births
1561 deaths
People from Biberach (district)